Saddam Ben Aziza (born 8 February 1991) is a Tunisian professional footballer who plays as a defender for the Tunisian club Étoile Sahel.

Club career
Ben Aziza is a youth product of Étoile Sahel, and signed his first contract with the club on 28 December 2009. He made his professional debut with Beni-Khalled in a 1–0 Tunisian Ligue Professionnelle 1 loss to ES Tunis on 22 August 2012.

International career
Ben Aziza debuted for the Tunisia national team in a 1–0 2020 African Nations Championship qualification victory over Libya on 21 September 2021.

References

External links

FDB Profile

1991 births
Living people
People from Sousse Governorate
Tunisian footballers
Tunisia international footballers
Association football defenders
Olympique Béja players
Étoile Sportive du Sahel players
Al-Shamal SC players
ES Beni-Khalled players
ES Métlaoui players
AS Gabès players
Tunisian Ligue Professionnelle 1 players
Tunisian expatriate footballers
Tunisian expatriate sportspeople in Qatar
Expatriate footballers in Qatar